Turner is an unincorporated community in Posey Township, Clay County, Indiana. It is part of the Terre Haute Metropolitan Statistical Area.

Geography

History
Turner was originally known as Newburg and was founded as such in 1854 by Joshua Modesitt along the Terre Haute and Indianapolis railroad. The post office was renamed Turner during the 1870s. When once thriving, the town had several general stores, a pottery, a United Brethran congregation, and several schools. The railroad is no longer in existence, although one can still observe evidence of such in the form of cleared paths through thickets in and around the town.

References

Unincorporated communities in Clay County, Indiana
Unincorporated communities in Indiana
Terre Haute metropolitan area